BarlowGirl is the self-titled debut album from the Christian rock and CCM band, BarlowGirl. The album was released on February 24, 2004 on Fervent Records.
The album hit No. 14 on Billboard magazine's Top Heatseekers chart, and No. 9 on the Top Christian Albums chart.

Track listing

Singles 
A total of five singles were released for this album:
 "Harder Than the First Time" is the album's debut single. It peaked at No. 16 on the Radio & Records (R&R) Christian Rock chart and at No. 18 on the Christian Hit Radio (CHR) chart.
 "Never Alone" set a record for the longest running No. 1 song on the R&R Christian CHR and Rock charts in 2004.  The song also peaked at No. 20 on the R&R Christian Adult Contemporary (AC) chart and at No. 21 on Billboard Hot Christian Songs. BarlowGirl beat its R&R CHR record the following year with their single "I Need You to Love Me" from their sophomore release, Another Journal Entry.
 "Clothes" was released for airplay on Radio Disney.
 "Mirror" peaked at No. 3 on the R&R Christian CHR chart and No. 37 on Billboard Hot Christian Songs.
 "On My Own" peaked at No. 18 on the AC chart.

References 

2004 albums
BarlowGirl albums
Fervent Records albums